Neferkamin Anu was a pharaoh of ancient Egypt during the First Intermediate Period, c2181 - 2055 BC. According to the Abydos King List and the latest reconstruction of the Turin canon by Kim Ryholt, he was the 13th king of the Eighth Dynasty. This opinion is shared by the Egyptologists Jürgen von Beckerath, Thomas Schneider and Darrell Baker. As a pharaoh of the Eighth Dynasty, Neferkamin Anu would have reigned over the Memphite region.

Attestations
Neferkamin Anu is mentioned on the entry 52 of the Abydos King list, which was compiled in the early Ramesside period. The list names his predecessor as Neferkare Pepiseneb and his successor as Qakare Ibi. The Turin canon identifies Nerferkamin Anu with a Nefer mentioned on column 4, line 10 of the document, which is in agreement with the Abydos king list. Any detail about Neferkamin Anu's reign is lost in a lacuna of the Turin canon.

Name
The name of Neferkamin Anu is transliterated as Neferkamin Anu even though it is reported as Sneferka Anu on the Abydos King list. The reason for this transliteration is that the hieroglyph sign O34, reading s, could replace the sign R22 for the god Min and reading Mn.

References

22nd-century BC Pharaohs
Pharaohs of the Eighth Dynasty of Egypt